The 1974 United States Senate election in Colorado took place on November 5, 1974. Incumbent Republican U.S. Senator Peter Dominick ran for re-election to a third term in office, but was defeated by Democrat Gary Hart.

Democratic primary

Candidates
Gary Hart, campaign manager for George McGovern in 1972
Marty Miller, Arapahoe County District Attorney
Herrick Roth, former State Senator from Denver

Results

General election

Results

See also 
 1974 United States Senate elections

References

1974
Colorado
United States Senate